Pavol Hammel (born 7 December 1948, in Bratislava) is a Slovak musician, singer and producer.

Pavol Hammel was born to a family of musicians. His father played violin in the Slovak National Theatre, and influenced Pavol to become a promising violin player too.

He graduated from the Faculty of Law, Comenius University in Bratislava in 1976. He gained fame initially in the group Prúdy, but has since established a successful solo career.

He is married and has two daughters.

Discography

Studio albums 
 Zvoňte zvonky (1969)
 Pokoj vám  (1969)
 Pavol Hammel a Prúdy (1970)
 Som šťastný, keď ste šťastní (1971)
 Zelená pošta (1972)
 Šľahačková princezná (1973)
 Hráč (1975)
 Na II. programe sna (1976)
 Stretnutie s tichom (1978)
 On a Ona (1979)
 Vrabec vševed (1979)
 Faust a margréty (1980)
 Čas malín (1981)
 Now I Know (1982)
 Dnes už viem (1983)
 Všetko je inak (1989)
 Labutie piesne (1993)
 Život je... (1997)
 Prúdy 1999 (1999)
 Cyrano z predmestia (1999)
 Šálka čaju (2002)
 Starí kamoši (2002)
 Kreditka srdca (2004)
 Srdce bez anjela (2020)

Prizes
 1978 – Bratislava Golden Lyre for music to the song "Student Love"
 1988 – Bratislava Bronze Lyre for music to the song "Today Love is an Anchor"
 2009 – Paul Strauss Prize

See also
 The 100 Greatest Slovak Albums of All Time

References
 Official site

External links 
 Official website

20th-century Slovak male singers
1948 births
Living people
Musicians from Bratislava
Slovak record producers
Comenius University alumni
21st-century Slovak male singers
Czechoslovak male singers